The Day After Trinity (a.k.a. The Day After Trinity: J. Robert Oppenheimer and the Atomic Bomb) is a 1980 documentary film directed and produced by Jon H. Else in association with KTEH public television in San Jose, California. The film tells the story of J. Robert Oppenheimer (1904–1967), the theoretical physicist who led the effort to build the first atomic bomb, tested in July 1945 at Trinity site in New Mexico. It features interviews with several Manhattan Project scientists, as well as newly declassified archival footage.

The film's title comes from an interview seen near the conclusion of the documentary. Robert Oppenheimer is asked for his thoughts on Sen. Robert F. Kennedy's efforts to urge President Lyndon Johnson to initiate talks to stop the spread of nuclear weapons. "It's 20 years too late," Oppenheimer replies. After a pause he states, "It should have been done the day after Trinity."

Cast
in order of first appearance
Haakon Chevalier — writer, friend of J. Robert Oppenheimer
Hans Bethe — Los Alamos physicist, Nobel laureate in physics
Francis Fergusson — writer, friend of J. Robert Oppenheimer
Robert Serber — physicist, Los Alamos
Robert Wilson — physicist, Los Alamos
Frank Oppenheimer — physicist, Los Alamos, brother of Robert Oppenheimer
I.I. Rabi — Manhattan Project physicist, Nobel laureate
Freeman Dyson — physicist, Institute for Advanced Study
Stirling Colgate — physicist, Los Alamos
Stan Ulam — mathematician, Los Alamos
Robert Porton — G.I., at Los Alamos during World War II
Françoise Ulam — writer, wife of Stanislaw Ulam
Dorothy McKibben — former head, Manhattan Project office, Santa Fe, New Mexico
Robert Krohn — physicist, Los Alamos
Jane Wilson — writer, wife of Robert Wilson
Jon Else — filmmaker, interviewer
Holm Bursom — rancher, Socorro, New Mexico
Dave MacDonald — rancher, Socorro, New Mexico
Susan Evans — resident, New Mexico
Elizabeth Ingram — merchant, San Antonio, New Mexico

Appearing in archive film

J. Robert Oppenheimer
General Leslie Groves
President Harry Truman
Senator Joseph McCarthy

Home media
The Day After Trinity was released on VHS cassette by Pyramid Home Video, and on Region 1 DVD by Image Entertainment.  A CD-ROM that was released in 1995 included interviews, transcripts, annotations, biographies and other information.

Reviews

Awards
The Day After Trinity was nominated for an Academy Award for Best Documentary Feature of 1980, and received a Peabody Award in 1981.

The Day After Trinity won a CINE Golden Eagle.

References

External links

1980 films
1980 documentary films
American documentary films
1980s English-language films
Documentary films about nuclear war and weapons
Films about the Manhattan Project
Films with screenplays by David Peoples
J. Robert Oppenheimer
Peabody Award-winning broadcasts
1980s American films